James Scott Pringle is a Canadian botanist.

Life 

James Scott Pringle is Plant Taxonomist at Royal Botanical Gardens in Burlington, Ontario, Canada. He completed his undergraduate education at Dartmouth College in Hanover, New Hampshire, United States. He earned his doctorate at University of Tennessee under the supervision of Aaron John Sharp.

Work 
Dr. Pringle joined the staff of Royal Botanical Gardens in 1963, as RBG's first full-time scientist.

Over the course of his career to date, Dr. Pringle has been binomial author or co-author of many species of plants. He has named or updated the taxonomy of 88 species, subspecies, and sub-families of various vascular plants, mostly in the Gentian Family. He is also a published authority on the history of botanical exploration in Canada. He serves as an Adjunct Professor in the Biology Department of McMaster University.

In 2004 a newly described species of tree, Macrocarpaea pringleana, was named in Dr. Pringle's honour. M. pringleana is a one- to five-metre tall member of the Gentian Family from the Central Andes, just north of the equator.

In 2015 a newly discovered species of Gentian native to the Himalaya, Kuepferia pringlei, was named to honour Dr. Pringle.

References

External links 
 James Scott Pringle at IPNI.org

20th-century Canadian botanists
21st-century Canadian botanists
Living people
Year of birth missing (living people)